Domingo Ramírez de Arellano, O.S.H. or Domingo de Villaescusa y Ramírez de Arellano (1568 – 2 July 1653) was a Roman Catholic prelate who served as Bishop of Yucatán (1652–1653) and Bishop of Chiapas (1640–1652).

Biography
Domingo Ramírez de Arellano was born in Villaescusa, Spain in 1568 and ordained a priest in the Order of Saint Jerome.
On 19 November 1640, he was appointed during the papacy of Pope Urban VIII as Bishop of Chiapas.
On 24 March 1641, he was consecrated bishop by Timoteo Pérez Vargas, Titular Bishop of Lystra, with Miguel Avellán, Titular Bishop of Siriensis, and Fernando Montero Espinosa, Bishop of Nueva Segovia, serving as co-consecrators. 
On 2 December 1652, he was appointed during the papacy of Pope Innocent X as Bishop of Yucatán.
He served as Bishop of Yucatán until his death on 2 July 1653.

References

External links and additional sources
 (for Chronology of Bishops) 
 (for Chronology of Bishops)  
 (for Chronology of Bishops) 
 (for Chronology of Bishops) 

17th-century Roman Catholic bishops in Mexico
Bishops appointed by Pope Urban VIII
Bishops appointed by Pope Innocent X
1568 births
1653 deaths
Hieronymite bishops